Coongan could refer to:

 Coongan River, A river in Western Australia
 Coongan Station, a pastoral lease in Western Australia